Chawan is a surname predominantly found in the Indian subcontinent.

Notable people 

Anuja Chauhan
Ashok Chavan
Bahadur Singh Chauhan
Charlie Chauhan
Chetan Chauhan
Gajendra Chauhan
Gogaji Chauhan
Hammir Dev Chauhan, King of Ranthambore
Jagjit Singh Chauhan
Maneet Chauhan
Mohit Chauhan
Prithviraj Chauhan, King of Delhi
Prithviraj Chavan
Rajesh Chauhan
Rajkumar Chauhan
Ravi Chauhan
Rohit Jugraj Chauhan
 Sanjay Chauhan (politician), mayor of Shimla Municipal Corporation
 Sanjay Singh Chauhan (born 1961), Gujjar leader
 Sanjay Chauhan (screenwriter) (born 1962), Indian screenwriter
 Sanjay Puran Singh Chauhan (born 1975), Indian film director and screenwriter
Sahab Singh Chauhan
 Captain Sanjay Chauhan, Indian soldier
Shivraj Singh Chauhan
Sonal Chauhan
Sonika Chauhan
Subhadra Kumari Chauhan
Sunidhi Chauhan
Vikram Singh Chauhan
Hemant Chauhan

See also
Chuhandanda, Nepalese village named after Kshetri Chuhans

References

Books

Indian surnames
Nepali-language surnames
Khas surnames